The HTC S710 (a.k.a. HTC Vox) is a mobile phone manufactured by HTC. As with other HTC models it is often sold carrier branded.

Some highlights include:
 Based on the Windows Mobile 6 Standard platform
 TI OMAP 850 Performance : 200 MHz Processor from Texas Instrument
 Auto-sliding QWERTY keyboard for easier typing
 Large 2.4” QVGA TFT LCD (Portrait and Landscape modes)
 Receive e-mails as they arrive with Direct Push technology
 Improved Calendar functionalities
 Windows Live (although not in the Orange version)
 Windows Vista synchronization via Windows Mobile Device Center

Availability
 available from Orange SA, Vodafone and others. Manufacturing is stopped for this product.

Notes

External links 
 Linux for the Vox, Vonix wiki page
  Official North American website of the HTC S710
 HTC Source: a news blog dedicated to HTC devices
 Official HTC wiki page for the HTC Vox
 Written or audio review of the HTC S710 from IT Week
 Beta version review by Mobile-review
  Product page of Orange SPV E650 at orange.co.uk
  HTC S710 User Manual

S710
Windows Mobile Standard devices
Mobile phones with an integrated hardware keyboard